Ānanda Mārga ("The Path of Bliss", also spelled Anand Marg and Ananda Marg) or officially Ānanda Mārga Pracāraka Saṃgha (organization for the propagation of the path of bliss), is a world-wide socio-spiritual organisation founded in Jamalpur, Bihar, India, in 1955 by Prabhat Ranjan Sarkar, known as Shrii Shrii Anandamurti. It is also the name of the philosophy and life-style propounded by Sarkar, described as a practical means of personal development and the transformation of society. It is established in more than 180 countries across the world. Its motto is Ātmamokśārthaṃ jagaddhitāya ca (Self-Realisation and Service to the Universe).

Tantra yoga, as interpreted by Sarkar, serves as the foundation of Ananda Marga. According to his teachings, Tantra means liberation from darkness through the expansion of mind. Meditation is the main spiritual practice of this tantric tradition, which assists the practitioner to overcome weaknesses and imperfections. The path to liberation in Ananda Marga is free of religious dogmas, superstitions, artificial social barriers and ritualism. Ananda Marga recognizes spirituality and liberation as the birth right of every individual irrespective of one's race, caste, creed, nationality, gender, socio-economic status or belief system.

The basis of Ananda Marga practice is covered by a set of rules called the 'Sixteen Points' that guide the practitioner on both spiritual and social aspects. It consist of yoga asanas, mudras, bandhas, pranayama, self-massage and two specific dances, kaos'ikii and tandava. Lacto-vegetarian diet and fasting are also included as a fundamental part of yogic practice. The goal of Ananda Marga is "self-realization and the welfare of all".

Founding 
Prabhat Ranjan Sarkar, known as Sri Sri Anandamurti, founded the Ananda Marga on 1 January 1955 in the state of Bihar, India. Its stated aims are "liberation of self and service to humanity"..

Disciplines, teachings and practice 

Prabhat Ranjan Sarkar developed a discipline of Tantra yoga and meditation. Tantra yoga, as interpreted by him, is the practical philosophy which serves as foundation of Ananda Marga. According to Sarkar's teachings Tantra means liberation from darkness.
Meditation is the main spiritual practice of this tradition, and through it the practitioner struggles to overcome weaknesses and imperfections. The basis of Ananda Marga practice is covered by a set of rules called the 'Sixteen Points' that guide the practitioner on both spiritual and social aspects. Sarkar expounded these principles in his 1961 , in Sanskrit.

Meditation, Lalita Marmika dance and kirtan 

In the Tantric tradition of Ananda Marga, the spiritual aspirant or sadhaka practices sadhana. This signifies the effort through which a person becomes completely realized. In Tantra the spiritual master, the guru, plays a special role, guiding students on the spiritual path. The aspirant learns meditation from a qualified acarya. An acarya is most commonly a monk or nun, but in the Ananda Marga tradition there are also "family acaryas". In the initiation the aspirant makes a commitment to practice meditation and to live in harmony with the universal balance, and is then taught the technique itself. The aspirant is then required to keep the individual lessons personal. In addition, he also taught Kapalika meditation to many sanyásins. His system of yoga can be termed as Rájadhirája Yoga, Tantra Yoga, or simply Ánanda Márga Yoga. The basic Ananda Marga meditation system is called Sahaja Yoga. The system consists of six meditation techniques or lessons taught one by one, on a personal basis. The six lessons are: 1)Iishvara Pranidhana (Personal mantra and Ishta Cakra), 2) Guru Mantra (Personal Guru Mantra), 3) Tattva Dharana (Concentration on Cakras' Tattvas), 4) Sadharana Pranayama (Basic Pranayama. A special breathing technique), 5) Cakra Shodhana (Purification of Cakras. A special type of Dharana), 6) Guru Dhyana (Special type of ideation for Dhyana). A set of higher meditation lessons is taught to advanced practitioners committed to dedicate more time for spiritual practices and universal service.

According to the Ananda Marga system, the Lalita Marmika dance is performed particularly during the collective meditation. It was supposedly invented by Parvati, the wife of the god Shiva. This yogic dance with swaying movements, combined with a kirtan (the chanting of the universal mantra), is regarded as useful in freeing the mind and preparing it for meditation. Ananda Marga members are recommended to practice collective meditation at least once a week. These meetings, Dharma Chakras (held weekly in the Dhyan Mandir), are preceded by the singing of Prabhat Samgiita ("Songs of the New Dawn" composed by Sarkar) followed by the spiritual dance of Lalita Marmika. Before meditation the  mantra is chanted. Baba Nam Kevalam is a universal kirtan mantra given by Sarkar.

Vegetarian diet, yogic asanas, physical exercises and yogic treatments 

The basic practices of Ananda Marga are yoga asanas, mudras, bandhas, pranayama, self-massage and two specific dances, kaos'ikii and tandava. These are accompanied by Lacto-vegetarian diet and fasting.

 Diet and fasting: Lacto-vegetarian diet avoids meat, fish, eggs and some substances which are said to have a negative effect on the mind, particularly if "mucus-producing". On specific monthly dates called Ekadashi (Sanskrit: একাদশী, ekādaśī, the eleventh day after the full moon), the regular practice of Upavasa (yoga fasting) is recommended to improve health and strengthen the mind.
 Yoga asanas, mudras and bandhas: comprises 42 asanas chosen by Sarkar.  The asanas are to be performed at least once a day.  15 Yoga mudras and bandhas are included.
 Yogic treatments: in 1957 Sarkar published in Bengali Yaogika Cikitsa o Dravyaguna, translated into English and published in 1983, with revisions under the title Yogic Treatments and Natural Remedies. In this handbook, he described yogic treatments using asanas and mudras with claims about natural and traditional remedies for about forty diseases.
 Kaoshikii: the 'dance for mental expansion', was defined by Sarkar a 'physico-psycho-spiritual dance,' performed by all, and consists of 18 mudras aligning with 6 physical postures, each associated with a specific idea while strengthening body and mind and making them flexible.
 Tandava or Tāṇḍava: is a vigorous dance. This dance is only performed by male followers. The dance is performed to imbue the practitioner's mind with courage and honour, dispelling all sorts of complexes and fear, even fear of death itself.

Spiritual and social philosophy 
The philosophy of Ananda Marga is a synthetic outlook, recognizing a theistic singularity or 'Supreme Consciousness', which is claimed to be both transcendental and manifested in all. 
To this end Ananda Marga suggests what it claims is a practical, rational, and systematic way of life for the balanced development of all human potentialities: physical, psychic and spiritual. This incorporate practices from hygiene, diet, and yoga postures, to a  technique of meditation based on moral rules directed to inner fulfillment. It recognizes that a balance is needed between the spiritual and mundane aspects of existence, and that neither one should be neglected at the expense of the other. Hence, the goal of Ananda Marga is "self-realization and the welfare of all".

Spiritual philosophy 

The spiritual philosophy of Ananda Marga recognizes that the universe is the creation of the mental thought waves of the 'Supreme consciousness'. The following is a brief list of the essential elements of Ananda Marga spiritual philosophy:
 Atma or Soul and Paramatma or the Cosmic Consciousness: the Consciousness (Purusa) is reflected in the unit objects forming the "unit consciousness" or atma. Particularly the reflection of the soul on the mind is called  and in that case the "reflector-soul" is called Paramatma (Supreme Soul).

Here the awareness of mind is very close to the direct experience of "Supreme Consciousness".
 Microvita theory: Microvita means "micro-life". The concept was introduced in 1986 through a series of lectures by Sarkar. According to this notion, microvita are entities which come within the realms both of physicality and of psychic expression. They are imagined as smaller and subtler than physical atoms and subatomic particles. So far as physicality is concerned, the position of these microvita is just between ectoplasm and electron, but they are neither ectoplasm nor electron. The author predicted that they would be recognized by conventional science when it is developed much further.

Social philosophy 

The social outlook of Ananda Marga asserts that human beings are an expression of the Supreme Being, the welfare of the individual is linked with the welfare of the collective, each relying on the other for its existence and dynamism. According to this philosophy everyone has the right to equal opportunities of life and development and as such there should be no discrimination on the basis of superficial barriers such as race, nationality and religion. Ananda Marga advocates a state if live, a world of justice, security and peace for all. The social philosophy covers neohumanism, education, culture, and the organisation's own Progressive utilization theory (PROUT). The philosophy reinterprets the general concept of culture by inserting it into a new universalistic outlook. As described by Antonello Maggipinto, "Sarkar offers a new point of view, with a large universalistic explanation: 'the culture of the whole human race is one, but marked by different local manifestations ... it is the same, but varying in expression.'" In 1968, Sarkar founded the organization "Proutist Block of India" to further the ideals of his theory through political and social action.

Tantra in Ananda Marga 

Sarkar weaves continuity with the ancient philosophy of Tantra, infusing new insights in human psychology, social theory and in each individuals' roles as spiritual and "socio-economic-cultural-political" beings. Ananda Marga Tantra is claimed to have a broad metaphysical base which allows for ways of knowing, feeling and processing which go beyond intellectuality or limited rationality. Priorities are given to the spiritual development, as Sarkar notes, "spiritual life controls all other arenas of human life." Ananda Marga Tantra is claimed to be a principle which if practiced will lead to the desired objective. The essence of Tantra is to awaken the latent spiritual force in the human personality and unify oneself with the Cosmic Consciousness.

Guru and disciple 

According to tantric tradition a proper preceptor and a proper disciple are both essential for success on the path of Tantra.
P.R. Sarkar clearly explains that, disciples are of three categories: 1) disciples that acquire spiritual knowledge when they are in close contact with the preceptor, but as soon as they are apart from him they forget all his/her teachings, 2) disciples that learn many things from the preceptor with great hardship, but do not take proper care to preserve those instructions. They lose their hard-earned knowledge out of negligence, 3) disciples that carefully preserve deep in their minds and hearts whatever they have learned from their preceptor by wisely putting those teachings into practice. This is the best category of disciples.

Controversies

Sarkar's incarceration 

During the 1960s, the organisation expanded rapidly in India, sending Acharyas as missionaries to other continents. Ananda Marga's popularity in India put it in direct confrontation with the Communist Party in West Bengal. In 1967, Ananda Marga headquarters came under attack by locals who were allegedly incited by Communist leaders. Criticism of corruption in the Indian government by acharyas of Ananda Marga also put it in confrontation with Prime Minister Indira Gandhi. In 1971, Sarkar was imprisoned in India for the alleged murder of five former Ananda Marga members, on what were later proved false charges. The Ananda Marga organisation was banned and a number its leaders arrested. In February 1973, Sarkar was poisoned in prison, allegedly by the jail doctor on orders from the higher echelons of government. On 1 April, after recovering his health, Sarkar began fasting in support of a demand for an investigation into his poisoning. That demand was never met. So he continued his fast for the next five years, four months, and two days, until 2 August 1978 when he was released from jail after having been proved innocent of all charges.

See also 

 Ananda Nagar, Purulia
 Jamalpur, Bihar
 List of new religious movements

References

Footnotes

Citations

Secondary sources 

 
 
 Hatley, Shaman; Inayatullah, Sohail (1999), "Karma Samnyasa: Sarkar’s reconceptualization of Indian ascetism", in K. Ishwaran, ed., Ascetic culture: renunciation and worldly engagement. Leiden, Brill, Vol. 73, International Studies in Sociology and Social Anthropology. pp. 139–152.

Primary sources 

 
 Anandamurti, Shrii Shrii (1988). Ananda Marga ideology and way of life in a nutshell. Calcutta: Ānanda Mārga Pracāraka Saṁgha.
 
 Nandita & Devadatta (1971). Path of bliss: Ananda Marga yoga. Wichita, Kansas: Ananda Marga Publishers.
 Tarak (1990). Ananda Marga, social and spiritual practices. Calcutta: Ananda Marga Publications.

External links

Ananda Marga.org
https://www.yogapedia.com/definition/10553/ananda-marga

Spiritual organizations
Yoga organizations
Modern Denominational Yoga
Shaiva sects
Universities and colleges affiliated with the Ananda Marga
Prabhat Ranjan Sarkar
Tantra
Jamalpur, Bihar
Organisations based in Bihar
Organizations established in 1955
1955 establishments in Bihar